The DN postcode area, also known as the Doncaster postcode area, is a group of 32 postcode districts in England, which are subdivisions of 13 post towns. These cover eastern South Yorkshire (including Doncaster), north Lincolnshire (including Grimsby, Scunthorpe, Barnetby, Barrow upon Humber, Barton-upon-Humber, Brigg, Cleethorpes, Gainsborough, Immingham and Ulceby), small parts of Nottinghamshire (including Retford) and the East Riding of Yorkshire (including Goole), and a very small part of North Yorkshire.

The S64 postcode district for Mexborough was earmarked as DN13, which has never been used. Otherwise, the area's districts are numbered sequentially up to DN22, and from DN31 to DN41.



Coverage
The approximate coverage of the postcode districts:

|-
! DN1
| DONCASTER
| Doncaster City Centre, Hyde Park
| Doncaster
|-
! DN2
| DONCASTER
| Intake, Wheatley, Wheatley Hills
| Doncaster
|-
! DN3
| DONCASTER
| Armthorpe, Barnby Dun, Branton, Edenthorpe, Kirk Sandall
| Doncaster
|-
! DN4
| DONCASTER
| Balby, Belle Vue, Bessacarr, Cantley, Hexthorpe, Warmsworth
| Doncaster
|-
! DN5
| DONCASTER
| Arksey, Barnburgh, Bentley, Cadeby, Cusworth, Harlington, High Melton, Scawsby, Scawthorpe, Sprotbrough, Sunnyfields, Toll Bar
| Doncaster
|-
! DN6
| DONCASTER
| Adwick-le-Street, Askern, Campsall, Carcroft, Fenwick, Moss, Norton, Sutton, Walden Stubbs, Woodlands
| Doncaster, Selby
|-
! DN7
| DONCASTER
| Dunsville, Dunscroft, Fishlake, Hatfield, Hatfield Woodhouse, Lindholme, Stainforth
| Doncaster
|-
! DN8
| DONCASTER
| Moorends, Sandtoft, Thorne
| Doncaster, North Lincolnshire
|-
! DN9
| DONCASTER
| Epworth, Finningley, Haxey, Auckley, Owston Ferry, Belton, Westwoodside
| Doncaster, North Lincolnshire
|-
! DN10
| DONCASTER
| Bawtry, Misson, Misterton, Scrooby
| Bassetlaw, Doncaster
|-
! DN11
| DONCASTER
| Bircotes, Harworth, New Rossington, Rossington, Tickhill, Wadworth
| Bassetlaw, Doncaster
|-
! DN12
| DONCASTER
| Conisbrough, Denaby Main, New Edlington, Old Denaby, Old Edlington
| Doncaster, Rotherham
|-
! DN14
| GOOLE
| Carlton, Eggborough, Goole, Hensall, Howden, Pincheon Green, Rawcliffe,  Snaith, Sykehouse, Whitley, Whitley Bridge
| Doncaster, East Riding of Yorkshire, Selby
|-
! DN15
| SCUNTHORPE
|  Alkborough, Appleby, Burton upon Stather, Coleby, Dragonby, Flixborough, Flixborough Ind Estate, Foxhills Ind Estate, Gunness, High Risby, High Santon, Low Risby, Low Santon, Normanby, Roxby, Scunthorpe, Thealby, West Halton, Whitton, Wintringham, Winterton
| North Lincolnshire
|-
! DN16
| SCUNTHORPE
| Bottesford, Holme, Queensway Ind Estate, New Brumby, Old Brumby, Frodingham, Raventhorpe &  Twigmoor
| North Lincolnshire
|-
! DN17
| SCUNTHORPE
| Althorpe, Amcotts, Bottesford Moor, Bottesford, Crowle, Derrythorpe, Ealand, East Butterwick, Eastoft, Garthorpe, Gunness, Keadby, Luddington, Messingham, North Ewster, Scunthorpe, Susworth, West Butterwick, Yaddlethorpe
| North Lincolnshire
|-
! DN18
| BARTON-UPON-HUMBER
| Barton-upon-Humber, South Ferriby, Horkstow
| North Lincolnshire
|-
! DN19
| BARROW-UPON-HUMBER
| Barrow-upon-Humber, Goxhill, New Holland
| North Lincolnshire
|-
! DN20
| BRIGG
| Brigg, Broughton, Hibaldstow, Scawby, Wrawby
| North Lincolnshire
|-
! DN21
| GAINSBOROUGH
| Gainsborough, Kirton Lindsey, Marton, Lea, Blyton, Scotter, Scotton
| West Lindsey 
|-
! DN22
| RETFORD
| Ranskill, Retford
| Bassetlaw
|-
! DN31
| GRIMSBY
| 
| North East Lincolnshire
|-
! DN32
| GRIMSBY
| Old Clee
| North East Lincolnshire
|-
! DN33
| GRIMSBY
| Nunsthorpe, Scartho, Scartho Top
| North East Lincolnshire
|-
! DN34
| GRIMSBY
| Laceby Acres, Little Coates
| North East Lincolnshire
|-
! DN35
| CLEETHORPES
| Cleethorpes
| North East Lincolnshire
|-
! DN36
| GRIMSBY
| Holton le Clay, Humberston, Ludborough, Marshchapel, New Waltham, North Cotes, North Thoresby, Tetney
| East Lindsey, North East Lincolnshire
|-
! DN37
| GRIMSBY
| Ashby cum Fenby, Barnoldby-le-Beck, Beelsby, Bradley, Brocklesby, Great Coates, Great Limber, Irby-upon-Humber, Laceby, Waltham
| North East Lincolnshire, West Lindsey
|-
! DN38
| BARNETBY
| Barnetby, Grasby, Searby, Somerby
| North Lincolnshire, West Lindsey
|-
! DN39
| ULCEBY
| Croxton, Kirmington, Ulceby, Wootton
| North Lincolnshire
|-
! DN40
| IMMINGHAM
| North Killingholme, South Killingholme, Habrough, Immingham, East Halton
| North Lincolnshire, North East Lincolnshire
|-
! DN41
| GRIMSBY
| Healing, Keelby, Stallingborough
| North East Lincolnshire, West Lindsey
|-
! style="background:#FFFFFF;"|DN55
| style="background:#FFFFFF;"|DONCASTER
| style="background:#FFFFFF;"|Royal Mail Physical-to-Electronic Centre (PTE), Royal Mail Returns Management Service
| style="background:#FFFFFF;"|non-geographic
|}

Map

See also
List of postcode areas in the United Kingdom
Postcode Address File

References

External links
Royal Mail's Postcode Address File
A quick introduction to Royal Mail's Postcode Address File (PAF)

Doncaster
Postcode areas covering Yorkshire and the Humber
Postcode areas covering the East Midlands